Wang Chao is a district (amphoe) of Tak province, western Thailand.

History
The minor district (king amphoe) Wang Chao was created by splitting off some parts of Mueang Tak district. It was announced on 26 June 1996 and became effective on 15 July.

On 15 May 2007, all 81 minor districts were upgraded to full districts. With publication in the Royal Gazette on 24 August the upgrade became official.

Geography
Neighboring districts are (west from clockwise): Phop Phra, Mueang Tak of Tak Province, Kosamphi Nakhon, Mueang Kamphaeng Phet, Phran Kratai of Kamphaeng Phet province.
  
The important water resources of the district are the Ping River and Khlong Wang Chao. Part of the Khlong Wang Chao National Park is in the southern part of the district.

Symbols
The district slogan is "Gateway to Tak, many different cultures, main economy is corn and longan, many beautiful waterfalls, Khlong Wang Chao national park, beautiful weaving".

Administration
The district is divided into three sub-districts (tambons), which are further subdivided into 28 villages (mubans). The township (thesaban tambon) Wang Chao covers parts of tambon Chiang Thong. There are a further three tambon administrative organizations (TAO).

References

External links
amphoe.com

Wang Chao